Dante Jardón (born 20 December 1988) is a Mexican professional boxer who challenged for the WBC super featherweight title in 2013.

Early life
Before becoming a boxer, Jardón was a member of Club Universidad Nacional's youth teams.

Professional career

Jardon vs. Ramirez 
His first loss came by first-round technical knockout (TKO) to Tomas Ramírez. He won the rematch by third-round TKO

Jardon vs. Palma 
After his win over Colombian Orlen Padilla, Dante was assaulted at gunpoint and shot in his left arm. He made his comeback by stopping in just two rounds José Palma.

Jardon vs. Rodela 
On March 26, 2010 Jardón beat veteran David Rodela by 3rd round TKO.

Jarodn vs. Tamakoshi 
On December 10, 2011 Jardón suffered an upsetting third-round KO defeat to Kyohei Tamakoshi, in what was supposed to be an stay-active fight.

Jardon vs. Tomlinson 
On 27 August, 2021, Jardon fought and defeated Anthony Tomlinson by knockout in the 9th round at the Ponds Forge Arena in Yorkshire.

Professional record

|- style="margin:0.5em auto; font-size:95%;"
|align="center" colspan=8|26 Wins (21 knockouts), 5 Losses (3 knockouts), 0 Draw
|- style="margin:0.5em auto; font-size:95%;"
|align=center style="border-style: none none solid solid; background: #e3e3e3"|Res.
|align=center style="border-style: none none solid solid; background: #e3e3e3"|Record
|align=center style="border-style: none none solid solid; background: #e3e3e3"|Opponent
|align=center style="border-style: none none solid solid; background: #e3e3e3"|Type
|align=center style="border-style: none none solid solid; background: #e3e3e3"|Rd., Time
|align=center style="border-style: none none solid solid; background: #e3e3e3"|Date
|align=center style="border-style: none none solid solid; background: #e3e3e3"|Location
|align=center style="border-style: none none solid solid; background: #e3e3e3"|Notes
|-align=center
|Win || 26-5-0 ||align=left|Jeffrey Arienza
|TKO || 6 (2:36) || 2015-04-25 ||align=left|Arena Coliseo, Mexico City, Mexico
|align=left|Won WBC International Silver lightweight title 
|-align=center
|Win || 25-5-0 ||align=left|Patricio Moreno 
|UD || 10 || 2015-01-31 ||align=left|Arena Coliseo, Mexico City, Mexico
|align=left|Won WBC FECOMBOX lightweight title 
|-align=center
|Loss || 24-5-0 ||align=left|Adrian Estrella 
|UD || 12 || 2014-07-05 ||align=left|Domo Care, Guadalupe, Nuevo León, Mexico
|align=left|For WBC FECARBOX super featherweight title
|-align=center
|Loss || 24-4-0 ||align=left|Takashi Miura
|TKO || 9 (0:55) || 2013-12-31 ||align=left|Ota-City General Gymnasium, Tokyo, Japan
|align=left|For WBC super featherweight title
|-align=center
|Win || 24-3-0 ||align=left|Gamaliel Díaz 
|TKO || 8 (0:52) || 2013-08-10 ||align=left|Auditorio Plaza Condesa, Mexico City, Mexico
|align=left|Retained WBC Continental Americas super featherweight title
|-align=center
|Win || 23-3-0 ||align=left|Akinori Kanai 
|TKO || 8 (2:23) || 2013-04-27 ||align=left|Arena Mexico, Mexico City, Mexico
|align=left|Retained WBC Continental Americas super featherweight title
|-align=center
|Win || 22-3-0 ||align=left|Adrian Verdugo 
|DQ || 2 (2:06) || 2013-01-12 ||align=left|Foro Polanco, Mexico City, Mexico
|align=left|Retained WBC Continental Americas super featherweight title
|-align=center
|Win || 21-3-0 ||align=left|Miguel Roman
|UD || 12  || 2012-10-13 ||align=left|Palacio de Deporte, Mexico City, Mexico
|align=left|Won WBC Continental Americas super featherweight title
|-align=center
|Loss || 20-3-0 ||align=left|Miguel Roman
|SD || 10  || 2012-07-28 ||align=left|Domo De La Feria, León, Guanajuato, Mexico
|align=left|
|-align=center
|Win || 20-2-0 ||align=left|Berman Sanchez 
|RTD || 7 (0:10) || 2012-04-07 ||align=left|Oasis Hotel Complex, Cancún, Mexico
|align=left|
|-align=center
|Loss || 19-2-0 ||align=left|Kyohei Tamakoshi
|KO || 3 (1:41) || 2011-12-10 ||align=left|Centro Expositor, Puebla, Puebla, Mexico
|align=left|Lost WBC Youth super featherweight title
|-align=center
|Win || 19-1-0 ||align=left|Ricky Sismundo
|KO || 7 (2:57) || 2011-9-24 ||align=left|Plaza de Toros, Juriquilla, Querétaro, Mexico
|align=left|Retained WBC Youth super featherweight title
|-align=center
|Win || 18-1-0 ||align=left|Adrian Tellez
|KO || 2 (1:27) || 2011-07-29 ||align=left|Cuervo Salon, Mexico City, Mexico
|align=left|Retained WBC Youth super featherweight title
|-align=center
|Win || 17-1-0 ||align=left|Claudio Rosendo
|TKO || 3 (2:59) || 2011-06-04 ||align=left|Foro Polanco, Mexico City, Mexico
|align=left|Retained interim WBC Latino and WBO Latino super featherweight titles
|-align=center
|Win || 16-1-0 ||align=left|Humberto Martínez
|TKO || 1 (1:44) || 2011-03-18 ||align=left|Cuervo Salon, Mexico City, Mexico
|align=left|Won interim WBC Latino and WBO Latino super featherweight titles
|-align=center
|Win || 15-1-0 ||align=left|René González
|UD || 10 (10) || 2011-01-15 ||align=left|Cuervo Salon, Mexico City, Mexico
|align=left|Retained WBC Youth super featherweight title
|-align=center
|Win || 14-1-0 ||align=left|José Palma
|DQ || 2 (0:10) || 2010-09-25 ||align=left|Cuervo Salon, Mexico City, Mexico
|align=left|Retained WBC Youth super featherweight title
|-align=center
|Win || 13-1-0 ||align=left|Orlen Padílla
|KO || 1 (1:42) || 2010-05-08 ||align=left|Plaza Condesa, Mexico City, Mexico
|align=left|Retained WBC Youth super featherweight title
|-align=center
|Win || 12-1-0 ||align=left|David Rodela 
|TKO || 3 (0:11) || 2010-03-26 ||align=left|Auditorio Plaza Condesa, Mexico City, Mexico
|align=left|Retained WBC Youth super featherweight title
|-align=center
|Win || 11-1-0 ||align=left|Adalberto Borquez
|KO || 2 (0:08) || 2009-12-19 ||align=left|Foro Scotiabank, Mexico City, Mexico
|align=left|Won WBC Youth super featherweight title
|-align=center
|Win || 10-1-0 ||align=left|Isaac Bejarano
|TKO || 1 (0:22) || 2009-09-30 ||align=left|Auditorio Plaza Condesa, Mexico City, Mexico
|align=left|
|-align=center
|Win || 9-1-0 ||align=left|Luis Pérez
|TKO || 4 (1:33) || 2009-06-24 ||align=left|Foro Scotiabank, Mexico City, Mexico
|align=left|
|-align=center

References

External links

Dante Jardon - Profile, News Archive & Current Rankings at Box.Live

1988 births
Boxers from Mexico City
Super-featherweight boxers
Living people
Mexican male boxers